Hermann Klein may refer to:

 Herman Klein (1856–1934), English music critic, author and teacher of singing
 Hermann Joseph Klein (1844–1914), German astronomer, author and professor